"Coney Island" (stylized in all lowercase) is a song by American singer-songwriter Taylor Swift, featuring American rock band the National. The song is taken from Swift's ninth studio album, Evermore (2020). It was released to US alternative radio on January 18, 2021, by Republic Records as the album's third and final single. Swift wrote the track with Joe Alwyn (under the pseudonym William Bowery) and the National members as well as its producers Aaron and Bryce Dessner.

"Coney Island" is an alternative rock duet that counterpoints Swift's melodious vocals against Matt Berninger's baritone. Lyrically, it depicts a separated couple's memories in Coney Island, New York City. Upon release, the song reached number 45 on the Billboard Global 200 chart. "Coney Island" charted in many countries, reaching 31 in Canada, 43 in Australia, and 63 in the United States. It further reached number 12 on the US Hot Rock & Alternative Songs chart and number 18 on the Adult Alternative Songs chart.

Background
Taylor Swift had collaborated with the National's Aaron Dessner on her 2020 album Folklore, an indie folk album that departs from the upbeat pop production of her previous releases. She and Dessner worked again on her follow-up album Evermore, a "sister record" to Folklore. This time, they also worked with Bryce Dessner, Aaron Dessner's twin brother.

The Dessner brothers sent Swift some of the instrumentals they made for their band, the National. One of those was what would become "Coney Island". Swift and her boyfriend, English actor Joe Alwyn, wrote its lyrics, and recorded it with her vocals. After listening to the demo, the Dessner brothers observed that the song feels very related to the National, and envisioned Matt Berninger (lead vocalist of the National) singing it, and Bryan Devendorf (drummer of the National) playing its drums. Aaron Dessner informed Berninger, who was "excited" for the idea. The band assembled, Devendorf played the drums, while his brother Scott Devendorf played the bass and pocket piano; Bryce Dessner helped produce the song.

Composition and lyrics

"Coney Island" is an alternative rock song written in the waltz tempo. The song features the National, with frontman Matt Berninger on vocals. Berninger said that work experience with Swift was "like dancing with Gene Kelly. She made [him] look good and didn't drop [him] once". The lyrics are about the hollow feelings of losing oneself in a relationship that has gone.

Critical reception
Spin critic Bobby Olivier described "Coney Island" as a "wonderfully dark duet" that feels like "a lonely waltz down a Brooklyn boardwalk", and praised the fusion of Swift's "wispy" head voice with Berninger's bass. Chris Willman of Variety compared the song to "Exile" (2020), another similar duet on Swift's preceding album, where former lovers take turns in blaming each other, with the opposite happening in "Coney Island". Neil McCormick of The Daily Telegraph wrote that the song "offers an insight into where their aesthetics meet", counterpointing Swift's "lucid, melodious voice" aside "the mumbled intensity" of Berninger's baritone. 

Tom Breihan of Stereogum called "Coney Island" the "dourest" moment of evermore, alike "The Last Time" in Swift's fourth studio album, Red (2012). Craig Jenkins of Vulture complimented Berninger's baritone and Swift's delicate vocals: "you hear [the song] and you start to wonder if the low end notes on these albums are another bout of trying out other singer-songwriters' wares". In less favourable reviews, The Guardian Alexis Petridis welcomed the guest appearance of Berninger, but found the lyrics to be "subpar" without "much substance". Pitchfork Sam Sodomsky opined that Berninger's vocals felt out of place on the song.

Commercial performance 
All of the tracks on Evermore debuted inside the top-75 of the Billboard Global 200 chart simultaneously; "Coney Island" was at number 45. In the US, the song opened at number 63 on the Billboard Hot 100 and number 12 on the Hot Rock & Alternative Songs chart. The song reached number 31 on the Canadian Hot 100. It further reached number 15 on the Flemish Ultratop 100, and number 43 in Australia. Upon service to US alternative radio, "Coney Island" reached number 18 on the Billboard Adult Alternative Songs chart.

Credits and personnel
Credits adapted from Tidal.

 Taylor Swift – lead vocals, songwriting
 The National – featured artist
 Aaron Dessner – production, songwriting, acoustic guitar, bass, drum machine programmer, electric guitar, percussion, recording engineer, studio personnel, synthesizer
 Bryce Dessner – production, songwriting, piano, synthesizer
 Bryan Devendorf – drum machine programmer, drums
 Scott Devendorf – bass guitar, piano
 Matt Berninger – vocals
 William Bowery – songwriting
 Clarice Jensen – cello
 Justin Treuting – drums, percussion
 Greg Calbi – mastering engineer
 Steve Fallone – mastering engineer
 Jonathan Low – mixer, recording engineer, vocal engineer
 Robin Baynton – vocal engineer
 Sean O'Brien – vocal engineer
 Yuki Numata Resnick – violin

Charts

Release history

References

2020 songs
2021 singles
American alternative rock songs
Coney Island in fiction
Republic Records singles
Songs about New York City
Songs about islands
Songs written by Aaron Dessner
Songs written by Bryce Dessner
Songs written by Taylor Swift
Song recordings produced by Aaron Dessner
Taylor Swift songs
The National (band) songs
Songs written by Joe Alwyn
Song recordings produced by Bryce Dessner